John William Ryan (August 12, 1929 – August 6, 2011) was an American academic administrator who most notably served as the President of Indiana University for sixteen years.

Early life and career

Ryan was born in Chicago, Illinois and earned a B.A. from the University of Utah in 1951, where he was a 1950 initiate of the Kappa Sigma Fraternity. He earned master's and Ph.D. degrees from Indiana University in 1958 and 1959, respectively.  While in graduate school, Ryan served in two professional roles:  first as a research analyst in the Kentucky Department of Revenue, then in establishing the graduate public administration program at Thammasat University.  After graduating, he taught political science at the University of Wisconsin–Madison. In 1962, he became executive assistant to the president of the University of Massachusetts Amherst before moving to Arizona State University at Tempe to assume the vice presidency for academic affairs.  He returned East to serve as the first chancellor of the University of Massachusetts Boston from 1965 to 1968.

Indiana University
In July 1968, Ryan returned to Indiana University to become vice president for regional campuses and became its fourteenth president on January 26, 1971. His 16 years of service to the university saw the establishment of two new IU campuses in New Albany (Indiana University Southeast) and in Richmond  (Indiana University East), the formation of various cultural centers on the Bloomington campus, and the creation of the School of Journalism, the School of Continuing Studies, the School of Optometry, and the School of Public and Environmental Affairs. Ryan retired in 1987 and was immediately appointed president emeritus of Indiana University. He remained an active figure within the university, both as a professor in the School of Public and Environmental Affairs and as a member of several boards and committees.

In one of his first official acts, Ryan hired legendary men's basketball coach Bob Knight on behalf of the IU Board of Trustees in 1971.

In the 1979 film Breaking Away, he played himself as president of the university, lecturing students on their behavior at the dining hall where they fought the Cutters (a reference to stonecutters who worked in the limestone quarries in southern Indiana).

On September 4, 2009, John Ryan was awarded the University Medal, IU's highest nonacademic award. According to an IU press release, "The University Medal honors individuals for singular or noteworthy contributions, including service to the university and achievement in arts, letters, science and law. It is the only medal that requires approval by the IU Board of Trustees.
The presentation was a particularly special occasion, because it was Ryan who, as president, created the University Medal in 1982, bestowing it first on Thomas T. Solley, director of the IU Art Museum. Ryan is only the tenth person to receive the medal."

The State University of New York
After retiring from Indiana University, Ryan took on temporary administrative roles, acting as interim president at the University of Maryland at Baltimore and at Florida Atlantic University, and advising the Papua New Guinea Commission for Higher Education.

In 1996, Ryan stepped in to fill the Chancellorship of the State University of New York after his predecessor abruptly resigned.  He was asked to assume the full Chancellorship in 1997  and stepped down at the end of 1999.

References

1929 births
2011 deaths
American political scientists
Presidents of the Florida Atlantic University
People from Chicago
University of Utah alumni
Chancellors of the State University of New York
University of Wisconsin–Madison faculty
University of Massachusetts Amherst faculty
Presidents of Indiana University